Kelang Island is an island in West Seram Regency, Maluku Province, Indonesia. It is a mountainous island located off the western tip of Seram Island, just east of Manipa. Sole, located on the northeastern side, and Tahalupu are the two principal villages. Tono, the highest point in the island, is an old volcano.

Babi Island is a 6 km long island located between Kelang and Seram. It is a relatively low island close off Kelang's northeastern side, separated from Kelang and Seram by narrow straits.

The inhabitants of Kelang speak the Luhu language, as well as Indonesian and Ambonese Malay.

References

Islands of the Maluku Islands
Landforms of Maluku (province)
Populated places in Indonesia